Ambohitrova is a rural municipality in Madagascar. It belongs to the district of Vohipeno, which is a part of the region of Fitovinany. The population of the municipality was 3,659 in 2018.

Rivers
The municipality is situated on the banks of the Sandrananta River.

References 
Loi 2015 - Creation de la Commune

Populated places in Fitovinany